
This is a list of players who graduated from the Challenge Tour in 2014. The top 15 players on the Challenge Tour's money list in 2014 earned their European Tour card for 2015.

* European Tour rookie in 2015
T = Tied 
 The player retained his European Tour card for 2016 (finished inside the top 110).
 The player did not retain his European Tour card for 2016, but retained conditional status (finished between 111 and 149).
 The player did not retain his European Tour card for 2016 (finished outside the top 149).

Lampert earned a direct promotion to the European Tour after his third win of the season in August, while Hébert earned his third win at the season-ending Challenge Tour Grand Final.

Winners on the European Tour in 2015

Runners-up on the European Tour in 2015

See also
2014 European Tour Qualifying School graduates

External links 
Final ranking for 2014

Challenge Tour
European Tour
Challenge Tour Graduates
Challenge Tour Graduates